Lopheliella moundforceae is a species of sea snail, a marine gastropod mollusk in the family Skeneidae.

Description

Distribution

References

 Hoffman L., Van Heugten B., and Lavaleye M. S. S. (2008) "A new genus with four new species in the family Skeneidae (Gastropoda) from the Rockall Bank, northeastern Atlantic Ocean". Miscellanea Malacologica 3: pp. 39–48

moundforceae
Gastropods described in 2008